Doug Coombs (September 24, 1957 – April 3, 2006) was an American alpine skier and mountaineer who helped to pioneer the sport of extreme skiing, both in North America and worldwide.

Early life and education 
Coombs was born in Boston and grew up in Bedford, Massachusetts, skiing in New Hampshire and Vermont. He attended Bedford High School (Massachusetts) before attending Montana State University in Bozeman where he honed his skiing skills at nearby Bridger Bowl before becoming a fixture of the extreme skiing scene in Jackson Hole, Wyoming, helping to found Valdez Heli-Ski Guides (and the heliskiing industry) in Alaska in 1994, and twice winning the World Extreme Skiing Championship, in 1991 and 1993.

Personal life and philanthropy
Coombs married Emily Gladstone in 1992 and, in 1993, they founded Doug Coombs Steep Skiing Camps Worldwide in Jackson Hole, Wyoming. In 1997, the Coombs moved the business to Europe, and the company continues to operate today in La Grave and Chamonix, in the French Alps. Doug and his wife Emily have a son, David. Doug's passion for skiing has been kept alive through the Doug Coombs Foundation. The Doug Coombs Foundation was established in 2013 to offer children from low-income families the guidance, support, and equipment required to participate in the amazing outdoor adventure experiences and sports activities that define the Jackson Community. Through these physical pursuits, it enables low-income children to reach their full potential and to become contributing members of society.

Death 
While skiing with friends on April 3, 2006, Doug Coombs died from a severe fall at the Couloir de Polichinelle in La Grave, France. He was trying to rescue his friend Chad VanderHam, who had fallen himself. Both skiers fell approximately 1500 feet. Doug Coombs was found dead after the fall, and VanderHam later died from his injuries. Coombs was 48.

A memorial for Coombs was held at Jackson Hole Mountain Resort on June 25, 2006. A run on the upper part of the mountain memorializes him.

Filmography 
While not an exhaustive list, Doug Coombs has been featured in a number of ski films, including:
Groove: Requiem In the Key of Ski (1991, Greg Stump), competing in the Extreme Skiing Invitational at Blackcomb, in which he complains that the course, in the Saudan Couloir, is not extreme
Aspen Extreme (1993), credited as stunt skier
Matchstick Productions "The Hedonist" (1994) Final scene.
Teton Gravity Research's The Continuum (1996)
Warren Miller's Cold Fusion (2001)
Warren Miller's Storm (2002)
Warren Miller's Journey (2003)
Waiting Game (2005)
Fantastic Four (2005), stunts
Warren Miller's Off the Grid (2006) contains a tribute to Doug Coombs
Steep (2007)
The Edge of Never (2009)
Swift. Silent. Deep. (2010), archive footage.

External links
 Doug Coombs Foundation

References

1957 births
2006 deaths
American male alpine skiers
Extreme skiers
Skiing deaths
Montana State University alumni
People from Bedford, Massachusetts
Sportspeople from Middlesex County, Massachusetts
Sport deaths in France
Bedford High School (Massachusetts) alumni